The South Asian Zoo Association for Regional Cooperation (SAZARC) is an organization for South Asian zoos and aquariums. SAZARC was established on August 4, 2000, at the first meeting of South Asian Zoos, held at Central Zoo, Kathmandu, Nepal, initiated by the Zoo Outreach Organisation (ZOO). It became a member of the World Association of Zoos and Aquariums (WAZA) in 2004, and membership was terminated by WAZA in 2015. SAZARC is considered the sister organization of the South East Asian Zoos Association (SEAZA), the only other regional association of zoos in Asia.

Conferences

The following table lists the year and venue of all annual conferences of SAZARC.

Members

 Founding members

 Other members
 (member since 2004)
 (member since 2010)

See also
 List of zoo associations

References

External links
SAZARC Introductory Page

International organizations based in Asia
Zoo associations
2000 establishments in India
Organizations established in 2000